This is a list of diseases starting with the letter "H".

Ha

Hag–Ham
 Hageman factor deficiency
 Hagemoser–Weinstein–Bresnick syndrome
 Hailey–Hailey disease
 Hair defect with photosensitivity and mental retardation
 Hairy cell leukemia
 Hairy ears, y-linked
 Hairy ears
 Hairy nose tip
 Hairy palms and soles
 Hairy tongue
 Hajdu–Cheney syndrome
 Halal–Setton–Wang syndrome
 Halal syndrome
 Hall–Riggs mental retardation syndrome
 Hallermann–Streiff syndrome
 Hallervorden–Spatz disease (renamed to Pantothenate kinase-associated neurodegeneration due to Hallervorden's Nazi party associations)
 Hallucinogen persisting perception disorder
 Hallux valgus
 Hamanishi–Ueba–Tsuji syndrome
 Hamano–Tsukamoto syndrome
 Hamartoma sebaceus of Jadassohn

Han–Hay
 Hand and foot deformity flat facies
 Hand–foot–uterus syndrome
 Hand wringing Rett syndrome
 Hand, foot and mouth disease
 Hand–Schüller–Christian disease
 Hanhart syndrome
 Harding ataxia
 Harlequin type ichthyosis
 Harpaxophobia
 Harrod–Doman–Keele syndrome
 Hartnup disease
 Hartsfield–Bixler–Demyer syndrome
 Hashimoto struma
 Hashimoto–Pritzker syndrome
 Hashimoto's thyroiditis
 Haspeslagh–Fryns–Muelenaere syndrome
 Hay–Wells syndrome recessive type
 Hay–Wells syndrome

He

Hea–Hei
 Headache, cluster
 Hearing disorder
 Hearing impairment
 Hearing loss
 Heart aneurysm
 Heart attack
 Heart block progressive, familial
 Heart block
 Heart defect round face congenital retarded development
 Heart defect tongue hamartoma polysyndactyly
 Heart defects limb shortening
 Heart hand syndrome Spanish type
 Heart hypertrophy, hereditary
 Heart situs anomaly
 Heart tumor of the adult
 Heart tumor of the child
 Heavy metal poisoning
 HEC syndrome
 Hecht–Scott syndrome
 Heckenlively syndrome
 Heide syndrome

Hel
 Heliophobia
 HELLP syndrome
 Helmerhorst–Heaton–Crossen syndrome
 Helminthiasis

Hem
 HEM dysplasia

Hema–Hemi
 Hemangioblastoma
 Hemangioendothelioma
 Hemangioma thrombocytopenia syndrome
 Hemangioma, capillary infantile
 Hemangioma
 Hemangiomatosis, familial pulmonary capillary
 Hemangiopericytoma
 Hematocolpos
 Hemeralopia, congenital essential
 Hemeralopia, familial
 Hemi 3 syndrome
 Hemifacial atrophy agenesis of the caudate nucleus
 Hemifacial atrophy progressive
 Hemifacial hyperplasia strabismus
 Hemifacial microsomia
 Hemihypertrophy in context of NF
 Hemihypertrophy intestinal web corneal opacity
 Hemimegalencephaly
 Hemiplegia
 Hemiplegic migraine, familial

Hemo
 Hemochromatosis
 Hemochromatosis type 1
 Hemochromatosis type 2
 Hemochromatosis type 3
 Hemochromatosis type 4
 Hemoglobin C disease
 Hemoglobin E disease
 Hemoglobin SC disease
 Hemoglobinopathy
 Hemoglobinuria
 Hemolytic anemia lethal genital anomalies
 Hemolytic-uremic syndrome
 Hemophagocytic lymphohistiocytosis
 Hemophagocytic reticulosis
 Hemophilia A
 Hemophilic arthropathy
 Hemophobia
 Hemorrhagic fever with renal syndrome
 Hemorrhoid
 Hemorrhagic proctocolitis
 Hemorrhagic thrombocythemia
 Hemorrhagiparous thrombocytic dystrophy
 Hemosiderosis
 Hemothorax

Hen
 Hennekam–Beemer syndrome
 Hennekam–Koss–de Geest syndrome
 Hennekam syndrome
 Hennekam–Van der Horst syndrome
 Henoch–Schönlein purpura

Hep
 Hepadnovirus D
 Heparane sulfamidase deficiency
 Heparin-induced thrombopenia
 Hepatic cystic hamartoma
 Hepatic ductular hypoplasia
 Hepatic encephalopathy
 Hepatic fibrosis renal cysts mental retardation
 Hepatic fibrosis
 Hepatic venoocclusive disease
 Hepatic veno-occlusive disease
 Hepatitis
 Hepatitis A
 Hepatitis B
 Hepatitis C
 Hepatitis D
 Hepatitis E
 Hepatoblastoma
 Hepatocellular carcinoma
 Hepatorenal syndrome
 Hepatorenal tyrosinemia

Her
 Herpes

Here

Hered

Heredi
Hereditary a – Hereditary m
 Hereditary amyloidosis
 Hereditary angioedema
 Hereditary ataxia
 Hereditary carnitine deficiency myopathy
 Hereditary carnitine deficiency syndrome
 Hereditary carnitine deficiency
 Hereditary ceroid lipofuscinosis
 Hereditary coproporphyria
 Hereditary deafness
 Hereditary elliptocytosis
 Hereditary fibrinogen Aα-Chain amyloidosis
 Hereditary fructose intolerance
 Hereditary hearing disorder
 Hereditary hearing loss
 Hereditary hemochromatosis
 Hereditary hemorrhagic telangiectasia
 Hereditary hyperuricemia
 Hereditary macrothrombocytopenia
 Hereditary methemoglobinemia, recessive
 Hereditary myopathy with intranuclear filamentous
Hereditary n – Hereditary t
 Hereditary nodular heterotopia
 Hereditary non-spherocytic hemolytic anemia
 Hereditary pancreatitis
 Hereditary paroxysmal cerebral ataxia
 Hereditary peripheral nervous disorder
 Hereditary primary Fanconi disease
 Hereditary resistance to anti-vitamin K
 Hereditary sensory and autonomic neuropathy 3
 Hereditary sensory and autonomic neuropathy 4
 Hereditary sensory neuropathy type I
 Hereditary sensory neuropathy type II
 Hereditary spastic paraplegia
 Hereditary spherocytic hemolytic anemia
 Hereditary spherocytosis
 Hereditary type 1 neuropathy
 Hereditary type 2 neuropathy

Herm–Hers
 Hermansky–Pudlak syndrome
 Hermaphroditism
 Hernandez–Aguire–Negrete syndrome
 Herpangina
 Herpes encephalitis
 Herpes simplex disease
 Herpes simplex encephalitis
 Herpes viridae disease
 Herpes virus antenatal infection
 Herpes zoster oticus
 Herpes zoster
 Herpesvirus simiae B virus
 Herpetic embryopathy
 Herpetic keratitis
 Herpetophobia
 Herrmann–Opitz arthrogryposis syndrome
 Herrmann–Opitz craniosynostosis
 Hers' disease
 Hersh–Podruch–Weisskopk syndrome

Het–Hex
 Heterophobia
 Heterotaxia (generic term)
 Heterotaxia autosomal dominant type
 Heterotaxy with polysplenia or asplenia
 Heterotaxy, visceral, X-linked
 Hexosaminidases A and B deficiency

Hh
 HHH syndrome

Hi

Hib–Hip
 Hibernian fever, familial
 Hiccups
 Hidradenitis suppurativa familial
 Hidradenitis suppurativa
 Hidrotic ectodermal dysplasia type Christianson Fouris
 High scapula
 High-molecular-weight kininogen deficiency, congenital
 Hillig syndrome
 Hing–Torack–Dowston syndrome
 Hinson–Pepys disease
 Hip dislocation
 Hip dysplasia Beukes type
 Hip dysplasia (canine)
 Hip dysplasia (human)
 Hip luxation
 Hip subluxation
 Hipo syndrome

Hir–Hiv
 Hirschsprung disease
 Hirschsprung disease ganglioneuroblastoma
 Hirschsprung disease polydactyly heart disease
 Hirschsprung disease type 2
 Hirschsprung disease type 3
 Hirschsprung disease type d brachydactyly
 Hirschsprung microcephaly cleft palate
 Hirschsprung nail hypoplasia dysmorphism
 Hirsutism congenital gingival hyperplasia
 Hirsutism skeletal dysplasia mental retardation
 His bundle tachycardia
 Histadelia
 Histapenia
 Histidinemia
 Histidinuria renal tubular defect syndrome
 Histiocytosis X
 Histiocytosis, Non-Langerhans-Cell
 Histoplasmosis
 Histrionic personality disorder
 Hittner–Hirsch–Kreh syndrome
 HIV

Hm
 Hm syndrome
 HMG-CoA lyase deficiency
 HMG CoA synthetase deficiency

Ho

Hod–Hol
 Hodgkin lymphoma
 Hodgkin's disease
 Hoepffner–Dreyer–Reimers syndrome
 Hollow visceral myopathy
 Holmes–Benacerraf syndrome
 Holmes–Borden syndrome
 Holmes–Collins syndrome
 Holmes–Gang syndrome
 Holoacardius amorphus
 Holocarboxylase synthetase deficiency
 Holoprosencephaly caudal dysgenesis
 Holoprosencephaly deletion 2p
 Holoprosencephaly ectrodactyly cleft lip palate
 Holoprosencephaly radial heart renal anomalies
 Holoprosencephaly
 Holt–Oram syndrome
 Holzgreve–Wagner–Rehder syndrome

Hom–Hoy
 Homocarnosinase deficiency
 Homocarnosinosis
 Homocystinuria due to cystathionine beta-synthase
 Homocystinuria due to defect in methylation (cbl g)
 Homocystinuria due to defect in methylation cbl e
 Homocystinuria due to defect in methylation, MTHFR deficiency
 Homocystinuria
 Homologous wasting disease
 Homozygous hypobetalipoproteinemia
 Hoon–Hall syndrome
 Hordnes–Engebretsen–Knudtson syndrome
 Horn–Kolb syndrome
 Horner's syndrome
 Hornova–Dlurosova syndrome
 Horseshoe kidney
 Horton disease, juvenile
 Horton disease
 Hot tub folliculitis
 Houlston–Ironton–Temple syndrome
 Howard–Young syndrome
 Howel–Evans syndrome
 Hoyeraal–Hreidarsson syndrome
 Hoyeraal syndrome

Hs
 HSV-2 infection

Hu
 Human ewingii ehrlichiosis
 Human granulocytic ehrlichiosis
 Human monocytic ehrlichiosis
 Human parvovirus B19 infection
 Humero spinal dysostosis congenital heart disease
 Humeroradial synostosis
 Humeroradioulnar synostosis
 Humerus trochlea aplasia of
 Hunter–Carpenter–Mcdonald syndrome
 Hunter–Jurenka–Thompson syndrome
 Hunter–Macpherson syndrome
 Hunter–Mcalpine syndrome
 Hunter–Mcdonald syndrome
 Hunter–Rudd–Hoffmann syndrome
 Hunter syndrome
 Huntington's disease
 Huriez scleroatrophic syndrome
 Hurler syndrome
 Hurst–Hallam–Hockey syndrome
 Hutchinson–Gilford–Progeria syndrome
 Hutchinson incisors
 Hutteroth–Spranger syndrome

Hy

Hya
 Hyalinosis systemic short stature
 Hyaloideoretinal degeneration of wagner

Hyd

Hyda–Hyde
 Hydantoin antenatal infection
 Hydatidiform mole
 Hydatidosis
 Hyde–Forster–Mccarthy–Berry syndrome

Hydr
 Hydranencephaly
 Hydrocephalus - Arnold Chiari - allied disorders
 Hydrocephalus autosomal recessive
 Hydrocephalus costovertebral dysplasia Sprengel anomaly
 Hydrocephalus craniosynostosis bifid nose
 Hydrocephalus endocardial fibroelastosis cataract
 Hydrocephalus growth retardation skeletal anomalies
 Hydrocephalus obesity hypogonadism
 Hydrocephalus skeletal anomalies
 Hydrocephalus
 Hydrocephaly corpus callosum agenesis diaphragmatic hernia
 Hydrocephaly low insertion umbilicus
 Hydrocephaly tall stature joint laxity
 Hydrolethalus syndrome
 Hydronephrosis
 Hydronephrosis peculiar facial expression
 Hydrophobia
 Hydrops ectrodactyly syndactyly
 Hydrops fetalis anemia immune disorder absent thumb
 Hydrops fetalis
 Hydroxycarboxylic aciduria
 Hydroxymethylglutaric aciduria

Hyg-Hym
 Hygroma cervical
 Hymenolepiasis

Hyp

Hyper

 Hyper IgE
 Hyper IgM syndrome

Hypera–Hyperb
 Hyperadrenalism
 Hyperaldosteronism familial type 2
 Hyperaldosteronism, familial type 1
 Hyperaldosteronism
 Hyperammonemia
 Hyperandrogenism
 Hyperbilirubinemia transient familial neonatal
 Hyperbilirubinemia type 1
 Hyperbilirubinemia type 2
 Hyperbilirubinemia

Hyperc–Hyperg
 Hypercalcemia, familial benign type 1
 Hypercalcemia, familial benign type 2
 Hypercalcemia, familial benign type 3
 Hypercalcemia, familial benign
 Hypercalcemia
 Hypercalcinuria idiopathic
 Hypercalcinuria macular coloboma
 Hypercalcinuria
 Hypercementosis
 Hypercholesterolemia due to arg3500 mutation of Apo B-100
 Hypercholesterolemia due to LDL receptor deficiency
 Hypercholesterolemia
 Hyperchylomicronemia
 Hyperekplexia
 Hypereosinophilic syndrome
 Hyperferritinemia, hereditary, with congenital cataracts
 Hypergeusia
 Hyperglycemia
 Hyperglycerolemia
 Hyperglycinemia, isolated nonketotic type 1
 Hyperglycinemia, isolated nonketotic type 2
 Hyperglycinemia, isolated nonketotic
 Hyperglycinemia, ketotic
 Hyperglycinemia, non-ketotic
 Hypergonadotropic ovarian failure, familial or sporadic

Hyperh–Hyperk
 Hyperhidrosis
 Hyperhomocysteinemia
 Hyper-IgD syndrome
 Hyperimidodipeptiduria
 Hyperimmunoglobinemia D with recurrent fever
 Hyperimmunoglobulin E - recurrent infection syndrome
 Hyperimmunoglobulinemia D with periodic fever
 Hyperimmunoglobulinemia E
 Hyperinsulinism due to focal adenomatous hyperplasia
 Hyperinsulinism due to glucokinase deficiency
 Hyperinsulinism due to glutamodehydrogenase deficiency
 Hyperinsulinism in children, congenital
 Hyperinsulinism, diffuse
 Hyperinsulinism, focal
 Hyperkalemia
 Hyperkalemic periodic paralysis
 Hyperkeratosis lenticularis perstans of Flegel
 Hyperkeratosis lenticularis perstans
 Hyperkeratosis palmoplantar localized acanthokeratolytic
 Hyperkeratosis palmoplantar localized epidermolytic
 Hyperkeratosis palmoplantar with palmar crease hyperkeratosis

Hyperl–Hypero
 Hyperlipoproteinemia type I
 Hyperlipoproteinemia type II
 Hyperlipoproteinemia type III
 Hyperlipoproteinemia type IV
 Hyperlipoproteinemia type V
 Hyperlipoproteinemia
 Hyperlysinemia
 Hyperopia
 Hyperornithinemia
 Hyperornithinemia, hyperammonemia, homocitrullinuria syndrome
 Hyperostosid corticalis deformans juvenilis
 Hyperostosis cortical infantile
 Hyperostosis corticalis generalisata
 Hyperostosis frontalis interna
 Hyperoxaluria type 1
 Hyperoxaluria type 2
 Hyperoxaluria

Hyperp–Hypers
 Hyperparathyroidism
 Hyperparathyroidism, familial, primary
 Hyperparathyroidism, neonatal severe primary
 Hyperphalangism dysmorphy bronchomalacia
 Hyperphenylalaninemia
 Hyperphenylalaninemia due to pterin-4-alpha-carbin
 Hyperphenylalaninemia due to dihydropteridine reductase deficiency
 Hyperphenylalaninemia due to 6-pyruvoyltetrahydrop
 Hyperphenylalaninemia due to dehydratase deficiency
 Hyperphenylalaninemia due to GTP cyclohydrolase deficiency
 Hyperphenylalaninemic embryopathy
 Hyperpipecolatemia
 Hyperprolactinemia
 Hyperprolinemia type II
 Hyperprolinemia
 Hyperreflexia
 Hyper-reninism
 Hypersensitivity
 Hypersensitivity type I
 Hypersensitivity type II
 Hypersensitivity type III
 Hypersensitivity type IV
 Hypersomnolence

Hypert–Hyperv
 Hypertelorism and tetralogy of Fallot
 Hypertelorism hypospadias syndrome
 Hypertension
 Hypertensive hyperkalemia, familial
 Hypertensive hypokalemia familial
 Hypertensive retinopathy
 Hyperthermia induced defects
 Hyperthermia
 Hyperthyroidism
 Hyperthyroidism due to mutations in TSH receptor
 Hypertrichosis atrophic skin ectropion macrostomia
 Hypertrichosis brachydactyly obesity and mental retardation
 Hypertrichosis congenital generalized X linked
 Hypertrichosis lanuginosa congenita
 Hypertrichosis lanuginosa, acquired
 Hypertrichosis retinopathy dysmorphism
 Hypertrichosis, anterior cervical
 Hypertrichotic osteochondrodysplasia
 Hypertriglycidemia
 Hypertrophic branchial myopathy
 Hypertrophic cardiomyopathy
 Hypertrophic hemangiectasia
 Hypertrophic myocardiopathy
 Hypertrophic osteoarthropathy, primary or idiopathic
 Hypertropia
 Hypertropic neuropathy of Dejerine-Sottas
 Hypertryptophanemia
 Hypervitaminosis A
 Hypervitaminosis D
 Hypervitaminosis E

Hypo

Hypoa–Hypof
 Hypoactive sexual desire disorder
 Hypoadrenalism
 Hypoadrenocorticism hypoparathyroidism moniliasis
 Hypoaldosteronism
 Hypo-alphalipoproteinemia primary
 Hypobetalipoproteinaemia ataxia hearing loss
 Hypobetalipoprotéinemia, familial
 Hypocalcemia, autosomal dominant
 Hypocalcemia
 Hypocalcinuric hypercalcemia, familial type 1
 Hypocalcinuric hypercalcemia, familial type 2
 Hypocalcinuric hypercalcemia, familial type 3
 Hypocalcinuric hypercalcemia, familial
 Hypochondriasis
 Hypochondrogenesis
 Hypochondroplasia
 Hypocomplementemic urticarial vasculitis
 Hypodermyasis
 Hypodontia dysplasia of nails
 Hypodontia of incisors and premolars
 Hypodysfibrinogenemia
 Hypofibrinogenemia, familial

Hypog–Hypol
 Hypoglycemia with deficiency of glycogen synthetase in the liver
 Hypoglycemia
 Hypogonadism cardiomyopathy
 Hypogonadism hypogonadotropic due to mutations in GR hormone
 Hypogonadism male mental retardation skeletal anomaly
 Hypogonadism mitral valve prolapse mental retardation
 Hypogonadism primary partial alopecia
 Hypogonadism retinitis pigmentosa
 Hypogonadism, isolated, hypogonadotropic
 Hypogonadism
 Hypogonadotropic hypogonadism syndactyly
 Hypogonadotropic hypogonadism without anosmia, X linked
 Hypogonadotropic hypogonadism-anosmia, X linked
 Hypogonadotropic hypogonadism-anosmia
 Hypohidrotic Ectodermal Dysplasia
 Hypokalemia
 Hypokalemic alkalosis with hypercalcinuria
 Hypokalemic periodic paralysis
 Hypokalemic periodic paralysis type 1
 Hypokalemic sensory overstimulation
 Hypoketonemic hypoglycemia
 Hypolipoproteinemia

Hypom
 Hypomagnesemia primary
 Hypomandibular faciocranial dysostosis
 Hypomelanotic disorder
 Hypomelia mullerian duct anomalies
 Hypomentia

Hypop
 Hypoparathyroidism familial isolated
 Hypoparathyroidism nerve deafness nephrosis
 Hypoparathyroidism short stature mental retardation
 Hypoparathyroidism short stature
 Hypoparathyroidism X linked
 Hypoparathyroidism
 Hypophosphatasia, infantile
 Hypophosphatasia
 Hypophosphatemic rickets
 Hypopigmentation oculocerebral syndrome Cross type
 Hypopituitarism micropenis cleft lip palate
 Hypopituitarism postaxial polydactyly
 Hypopituitarism
 Hypopituitary dwarfism
 Hypoplasia hepatic ductular
 Hypoplasia of the tibia with polydactyly
 Hypoplastic left heart syndrome
 Hypoplastic right heart microcephaly
 Hypoplastic thumb mullerian aplasia
 Hypoplastic thumbs hydranencephaly
 Hypoproconvertinemia
 Hypoprothrombinemia

Hypor–Hypox
 Hyporeninemic hypoaldosteronism
 Hyposmia nasal hypoplasia hypogonadism
 Hypospadias familial
 Hypospadias mental retardation Goldblatt type
 Hyposplenism
 Hypotelorism cleft palate hypospadias
 Hypothalamic dysfunction
 Hypothalamic hamartoblastoma syndrome
 Hypothalamic hamartomas
 Hypertonic gingivitus
 Hypothermia
 Hypothyroidism due to iodide transport defect
 Hypothyroidism postaxial polydactyly mental retardation
 Hypothyroidism
 Hypotonic sclerotic muscular dystrophy
 Hypotrichosis mental retardation Lopes type
 Hypotrichosis
 Hypotropia
 Hypoxanthine guanine phosphoribosyltransferase deficiency
 Hypoxia

H